The 2019 New South Wales Swifts season saw New South Wales Swifts compete in the 2019 Suncorp Super Netball season. Briony Akle guided Swifts to their second premiership. Despite losing their new captain, Maddy Proud, Kate Eddy and Lauren Moore to season-ending injuries, Swifts finished the regular season in second place. In the major semi-final, they lost to Sunshine Coast Lightning. However, they then defeated Melbourne Vixens in the preliminary final to qualify for the grand final where they faced Lightning again. Lightning were the champions in both 2017 and 2018 and had finished the 2019 regular season as minor premiers. As a result, Lightning started the grand final as favorites. Meanwhile, Swifts had begun the season as underdogs. They were not expected to have a good season. However, in the grand final they defeated Lightning 64–47 to emerge as champions.

Players

Player movements

2019 roster

Debutants
 Amorangi Malesala made her Swifts debut in Round 6 against Collingwood Magpies. 
 Elle Bennetts made her Swifts debut in Round 7 against Giants Netball. 
 Tayla Fraser made her Swifts debut in Round 10 against West Coast Fever.
 Kayla Johnson made her Swifts debut in Round 10 against West Coast Fever.
 Katrina Rore made her Swifts debut in Round 11 against Sunshine Coast Lightning.

#TeamGirls Cup
In the 2019 #TeamGirls Cup, Swifts defeated Giants Netball, West Coast Fever and Queensland Firebirds and eventually finished fifth.

Pool B Fixtures

5th/6th play off

Regular season

Fixtures and results

Standings

Play-offs

Major semi-final

Preliminary final

Grand Final

Award winners

References

New South Wales Swifts seasons
New South Wales Swifts